The Jains in Belgium are estimated to be around about 1,500 people.

The majority live in Antwerp, working in the wholesale diamond business. 

Belgian Indian Jains control two-thirds of the rough diamonds trade and supplied India with roughly 36% of their rough diamonds.

They have built building a major temple in Wilrijk (near Antwerp), with a cultural centre, which was consecrated in 2010.

The Jain community in Europe, especially in Belgium, is mostly involved in the diamond business.

History
The Jains starting arriving in Belgium in the 1960s. They initially traded low quality rough diamonds, with very small margins of profit, while the local Jewish merchants dealt in larger stones. These were sent to India for cutting and polishing, where labour costs were much lower. Gradually they started dealing in larger diamonds.

In 1992, The Jain Cultural Centre of Antwerp VZW was formed with 12 committee members and 52 founder members.

Land for a Jain temple and a meditation centre (Upashray) was purchased. In 2001, construction of Antwerp Jain temple and meditation hall began.

In 2007, Jain idol's Anjanshalaka took place on 31 January in India and was performed by Jain ascetics Acharya Shri Subodhsagarsuriswarji, Acharya Shri Manohar Kiritisagarsuriswarji, Acharya Udaykirtisagarsuriswarji and Shri Narendra Hiralal.

It was necessary to do that in India because the Jain monks do not travel overseas and in vehicles.

In 2008, on 25 August the idols were brought to Antwerp by air, this was followed by a huge procession.

In 2010, on 27 August, the Idol's pratistha was performed.
Principal deity of this temple is Parshvanatha, 23rd tirthankara of Jainism.

Jainism today 
The temple and meditation hall are widely used throughout the year, with all important dates celebrated.

Paryushana 
Paryushana is celebrated every year as a community.  In a show of unity, the Derāvāsī and Sthānakavāsī sects follow the paryushana at the same time.  Though according to the calendar of each there is a difference of between a few days to few weeks, each year the entire community follows the same paryushana at the same time by alternatively doing one year according to Deravasi calendar, and next year the Sthanakvasi calendar and so on.

Mahavir Janma Kalyanak 
In most centers the rocking of the dreams during Mahavir Janma Kalyanak are auctioned to the highest bidder.  At the Jain Culture Center of Antwerp, auctioning is not done.  Instead the rocking of dreams is done by those individuals that do the longer fasts, mostly of aathai and longer fasts.

Navpad Oli 
The fasting festival of oli is followed with all those who are fasting can come for the meal that they have once a day at the bhojanshala venue in the temple complex.

Paathshaala 
For children from ages 6 onwards there is paathsaala that runs on Sundays (11am -12 30pm) where children are taught about Jainism, its values and its scriptures. They are told the history of the gods.  This is run by mothers from the community.

Varsi Tapa 
Varsi Tapa is a year long fasting where people on alternative days fast (no food) and then have 2 meals the next day, and fast, and so on, for 13 months.

The 2 meals on the day that they eat are also provided at the bhojanshala in the temple complex.

Leaders within the community 
Mr Ramesh Mehta, a leader of the community, is a full-fledged member of the Belgian Council of Religious Leaders put up on 17 December 2009.

Photo gallery

See also

Jainism
Jainism in Europe
Jainism in the United States
Jainism in Africa
Jainism in India
Religion in Belgium
Brampton Jain Temple
 History of the Jews in Antwerp

References

Citation

Sources

External links
Antwerp Jain Temple Video

Jain communities
21st-century Jain temples